"Feel Good" is a song by the American recording artist, Robin Thicke, from his sixth studio album Blurred Lines (2013). The song was released to Top 40 radio stations on November 12, 2013, as the album's fourth and final single. It was produced by will.i.am.

Music video
A music video for "Feel Good" was directed by Sophie Muller and was premiered on December 16, 2013. A behind-the-scenes video of the music video was uploaded to YouTube on December 20, 2013.

Track listing

Credits and personnel
 Lead vocals – Robin Thicke
 Lyrics – will.i.am, Robin Thicke
 Producers – will.i.am
 Label – Star Trak Entertainment, Interscope Records

Charts

Release history

References

External links
 

2013 singles
Robin Thicke songs
Interscope Records singles
2013 songs
Music videos directed by Sophie Muller
Song recordings produced by will.i.am
Songs written by Robin Thicke
Songs written by will.i.am
Disco songs